İzzet Kaya (born 28 January 1977) is a Turkish professional footballer. He currently plays as a right fullback for Şanlıurfaspor in the TFF First League.

Life and career
Kaya was born in Muş, Turkey. He made his professional debut on 16 April 1995 in a match against TKİ Tavşanlı Linyitspor.

References

1977 births
Living people
People from Muş
Kurdish sportspeople
İnegölspor footballers
Bursaspor footballers
Kardemir Karabükspor footballers
MKE Kırıkkalespor footballers
Manisaspor footballers
Yalovaspor footballers
Boluspor footballers
Bucaspor footballers
Göztepe S.K. footballers
Association football fullbacks
Association football defenders
Turkish footballers